Brad Paisley Christmas is the first Christmas album and fifth studio album by American country music artist Brad Paisley. It was released on October 10, 2006, by Arista Nashville. His first album of Christmas music, features a mix of traditional Christmas songs and newly written songs. The track "Born on Christmas Day" was written by Paisley when he was thirteen years old, and the recording features elements from a recording Paisley made of the song in 1985. Also included is a cover of Buck Owens' "Santa Looked a Lot Like Daddy". Also included is "Kung Pao Buckaroo Holiday", a parody on political correctness.

Track listing

Personnel

Musicians 
 Bill Anderson, George Jones and Little Jimmy Dickens – The "Kung Pao Buckaroos" (11.1)
 Jim "Moose" Brown – keyboards, Hammond B3 organ 
 Randle Currie – steel guitar 
 Eric Darken – percussion 
 Addie Davis, Thomas Griffith, Erica Haines, Shannon Love Hartt and Allison Smith – kids choir (5) 
 Little Jimmy Dickens – lead vocals (12)
 Stuart Duncan – fiddle
 Kevin "Swine" Grantt – bass guitar, upright bass  
 Aubrey Haynie – fiddle *
 Wes Hightower – backing vocals 
 Mike Johnson – dobro, steel guitar
 Gordon Mote – acoustic piano, Hammond B3 organ 
 Brad Paisley – lead vocals (1-6, 8-11), acoustic guitar, electric guitars, arrangements (4, 7, 8) 
 Frank Rogers – arrangements (4, 7, 8) 
 Manny Rogers – kid voice (6)
 Ben Sesar – drums
 Bryan Sutton – acoustic guitar, mandolin 
 Sarah Valley – kids choir director and contractor (5) 
 Justin Williamson – fiddle

The Nashville String Machine
 David Angell, Kirsten Cassel, David Davidson, Conni Ellisor, Pamela Sixfin and Kristin Wilkinson – string players
 John Hobbs and Kristin Wilkinson – arrangements
 John Hobbs – conductor

Production 
 Richard Barrow – recording 
 Drew Bollman – additional recording, mix assistant 
 Brady Barnett – digital editing 
 Neal Cappellino – additional recording 
 The Fitzgerald Hartley Co. – management 
 Judy Forde-Blair – creative production, liner notes 
 Tyler Moles – digital editing 
 Justin Niebank – mixing 
 Brad Paisley – cover design, package design 
 Katy Robbins – stylist 
Frank Rogers – producer 
 Jim Shea – photography 
 David Schober – additional recording, recording assistant 
 Steve Short – recording assistant
 Katherine Stratton – package design
 Lori Turk – grooming 
Hank Williams – mastering 
 Brian David Willis – additional recording, digital editing
 Mixed and Edited at Blackbird Studio (Nashville, Tennessee).
 Mastered at MasterMix (Nashville, Tennessee).

Chart performance

Weekly charts

Year-end charts

References

2006 Christmas albums 
Albums produced by Frank Rogers (record producer) 
Arista Records Christmas albums
Brad Paisley albums
Christmas albums by American artists
Country Christmas albums